The Philippines Grand Prix was an open-wheel racing car motor race, held during the 1970s. The race was first held in 1973 as Formula Atlantic expanded across the region, becoming Formula Pacific as it did so. The race was held on a  street circuit in Greenhills, San Juan, Metro Manila. The race attracted the stars of the time like Hong Kong racer John MacDonald and was included in the inaugural Rothmans International Grand Prix Trophy series in 1976. The 1976 Rothmans Trophy race was won by New Zealander Graeme Lawrence and the race was scheduled to take part in the 1977 series but was cancelled. The race disappeared almost immediately afterwards and motorsport ceased in the Philippines for almost 20 years.

Winners of the Philippines Grand Prix

References 

 
National Grands Prix
Grand Prix
Recurring sporting events established in 1973
Sports in Metro Manila
Recurring sporting events disestablished in 1976
1973 establishments in the Philippines
1976 disestablishments in the Philippines